Midway is a city in Gadsden County, Florida, United States. The population was 3,004 at the 2010 census, up from 1,446 at the 2000 census. It is part of the Tallahassee, Florida Metropolitan Statistical Area.

History

Midway has a very long history going back to the early days of Florida during its contact by Spanish explorers. There is a myth that has it that it was a point determined by representatives from Pensacola and St. Augustine to be Florida's capital, even though no point has actually been proven.

In 1986, Midway was incorporated into a city by the special act of the Florida Legislature.

Geography

The city limits extend from the Little River in the west to the Ochlockonee River in the east. The Ochlockonee forms the Gadsden County–Leon County border.

The city is located along Interstate 10, with access from Exit 192 (U.S. Route 90). I-10 leads east  to Tallahassee and west  to Marianna. US 90 leads northwest  to Quincy, the Gadsden County seat, and east 12 miles into Tallahassee.

Demographics

2020 census

As of the 2020 United States census, there were 3,537 people, 1,237 households, and 888 families residing in the city.

2010 census
As of the census of 2010, there were 3,004 people, 1,204 households, and 789 families residing in the city. The racial makeup of the city was 86.90% African American, 10.80% White, 1.00% Asian, 0.50% Pacific Islander, 2.10% from other races, and 1.20% from two or more races. Hispanic or Latino of any race were 3.80% of the population.

There were 1,204 households, out of which 39.6% had children under the age of 18 living with them, 39.8% were married couples living together, 27.1% had a female householder with no husband present, and 26.6% were non-families. 28.5% of all households were made up of individuals, and 3.1% had someone living alone who was 65 years of age or older. The average household size was 2.79 and the average family size was 3.25.

In the city, the population was spread out, with 33.4% under the age of 18, 11.3% from 18 to 24, 26.6% from 25 to 44, 20.4% from 45 to 64, and 8.3% who were 65 years of age or older. The median age was 29 years. For every 100 females, there were 83.7 males. For every 100 females age 18 and over, there were 81.7 males.

The median income for a household in the city was $24,875, and the median income for a family was $26,389. Males had a median income of $21,650 versus $17,500 for females. The per capita income for the city was $11,287. About 26.2% of families and 31.3% of the population were below the poverty line, including 39.7% of those under age 18 and 28.2% of those age 65 or over.

Government and infrastructure

The Midway Post Office of the U.S. Postal Service serves the community.

Midway Volunteer Fire Department operates a station in Midway.

The Gadsden Express, a bus route operated by Big Bend Transit, has a stop in Midway.

Education

Gadsden County School District operates public schools serving Midway. As of 2017 Gadsden County High School (formerly East Gadsden High School) is the only remaining zoned high school in the county due to the consolidation of West Gadsden High School's high school section into East Gadsden High. From 2003 until 2017 East Gadsden High served as the high school for Midway.

Previously the district operated Midway Magnet School, an early childhood center constructed on land donated by Pat McLain, who once served as the mayor of Midway. The district had planned to make it into an elementary school.

References

External links

City of Midway official website

Cities in Gadsden County, Florida
Tallahassee metropolitan area
Populated places established in 1987
Cities in Florida